Dalian Hi-Think Computer Technology Corporation, often called DHC, is a provider of software development, industrial solutions and IT services headquartered in Dalian, Liaoning Province, China.  It was established in 1996 as an spin-out of Dalian Information Center and its capital amounts to 150,000,000 CNY. NEC, NTT Data, Hitachi Software Engineering, NEC Soft, NS Solutions, and Microsoft have invested in DHC.

Currently, employing around 6,000 people, DHC is one of the largest information technology outsourcing (ITO) and business process outsourcing (BPO) companies in Dalian (DHC, Hisoft, IBM, HP, Genpact and Accenture), the "Bangalore" of China or the "IT and Business Process Outsourcing Capital of China".

In March 2014, DHC moved its headquarters to DHC Software Park.

See also
Outsourcing
Neusoft Group
HiSoft Technology International
Dalian Software Park

References

External links
Official Dalian Hi-Think Computer website 

Software companies of China
Engineering companies of China
Outsourcing companies
Companies based in Dalian
Software companies established in 1996
1996 establishments in China
Companies listed on the National Equities Exchange and Quotations